Lo Esencial de... Alejandro Sanz is a triple album that contains Alejandro Sanz's albums Viviendo Deprisa, 3 and Más. For some reason, it doesn't include the album Si Tú Me Miras, which was released between Viviendo Deprisa and 3.

Track listing

CD1 (Viviendo Deprisa) 
 Los Dos Cogidos de la Mano - 5:02
 Pisando Fuerte - 4:28
 Lo Que Fui Es lo Que Soy - 4:40
 Todo Sigue Igual - 5:13
 Viviendo Deprisa - 3:17
 Se Le Apagó la Luz - 4:46
 Duelo al Amanecer - 3:31
 Completamente Loca - 3:32
 Toca Para Mi - 4:07
 Es Este Amor - 3:34

CD2 (3) 
 La Fuerza del Corazón - 5:05
 Por Bandera - 4:59
 Mi Soledad y Yo - 4:57
 Ellos Son Así - 4:39
 Quiero Morir en Tu Veneno (D'Romy Ledo, Adolfo Rubio, Alejandro Sanz) - 4:02
 ¿Lo Ves? - 3:48
 Canción Sin Emoción - 4:48
 Eres Mía - 5:25
 Ese Que Me Dio Vida - 3:58
 Se Me Olvidó Todo al Verte - 4:39
 ¿Lo Ves? (piano y voz) - 3:35

CD3 (Más) 
 Y ¿Si Fuera Ella? - 5:22
 Ese Último Momento - 5:04
 Corazón Partío - 5:46
 Siempre Es de Noche - 4:47
 La Margarita Dijo No - 4:52
 Hoy Que No Estás - 5:10
 Un Charquito de Estrellas - 4:50
 Amiga Mía - 4:48
 Si Hay Dios... - 5:36
 Aquello Que Me Diste - 4:46

References

Alejandro Sanz compilation albums
2001 compilation albums